Béla Apáti Abkarovics (born 1888, Érmihályfalva, Austro-Hungarian Empire - died 1957, Szentendre, Hungary) was a Hungarian painter and graphic artist.

External links
Fine Arts in Hungary

1888 births
1957 deaths
20th-century Hungarian painters
20th-century Hungarian male artists
Hungarian people of Serbian descent
Hungarian male painters